This is a list of Algerian football transfers in the 2016–17 winter transfer window by club. clubs in the 2016–17 Algerian Ligue Professionnelle 1 are included.

Ligue Professionnelle 1

CA Batna

In:

Out:

CR Belouizdad

In:

Out:

CS Constantine

In:

Out:

DRB Tadjenanet

In:

Out:

ES Sétif

In:

Out:

JS Kabylie

In:

Out:

JS Saoura

In:

Out:

MC Alger

In:

Out:

MC Oran

In:

Out:

MO Béjaïa

In:

Out:

NA Hussein Dey

In:

Out:

Olympique de Médéa

In:

Out:

RC Relizane

In:

Out:

USM Alger

In:

Out:

USM Bel-Abbès

In:

Out:

USM El Harrach

In:

Out:

References

Algeria
Lists of Algerian football transfers
2016–17 in Algerian football